Do Hollywood is the debut studio album by American rock band The Lemon Twigs. It was released on 14 October 2016 by 4AD. It was co-produced by Jonathan Rado of indie rock band Foxygen.

The album consists of 10 tracks written and performed almost entirely by teenage brothers Brian and Michael D'Addario. The instrumentation ranges from traditional rock and roll standbys such as guitar and bass to more eclectic elements like brass, organ, cello and xylophone. Both Brian and Michael sing lead vocals and play lead guitar or drums on various Lemon Twigs songs—usually each on his own compositions—and they often switch back and forth between the drum stool and the spotlight during live performances.

Critical reception

Do Hollywood received favorable reviews from most music critics. On Metacritic, the album holds an average critic score of 76, based on 14 critics, indicating "generally favorable reviews".

Track listing

Personnel
Credits adapted from Do Hollywood album liner notes.

 The Lemon Twigs – writing, additional production
 Brian D'Addario – vocals, guitar, bass, drums, piano, keyboards, violin, cello, trumpet, orchestration, mixing
 Michael D'Addario – vocals, guitar, bass, drums, piano, keyboards, percussion
 Jonathan Rado – production, mixing (6), vocals (10), guitar (4), electronic percussion (6, 10)
 Sam France – vocals (1, 2, 6)
 Danny Ayala – vocals (5)
 Ronnie D'Addario – mixing (7)
 Greg Calbi – mastering

References

2016 debut albums
The Lemon Twigs albums
4AD albums
Albums produced by Jonathan Rado
Progressive pop albums